Calceostoma is a genus of monogeneans in the family Calceostomatidae.

References

External links 

Monogenea genera
Monopisthocotylea